Durukaynak is a village in the Adıyaman District, Adıyaman Province, Turkey. The village is populated by Kurds of the Reşwan tribe and had a population of 264 in 2021.

References

Kurdish settlements in Adıyaman Province
Villages in Adıyaman District